András Rajnai was a Hungarian TV director and screenwriter who worked for Hungarian Television (Magyar Televízió Müvelödési Föszerkesztöség: MTV) between 1958 and 1996. He was born on July 7, 1934 in Budapest, Hungary, and died on January 28, 2004 (age 69), also in Budapest. He was known for his use of blue-screen special effects techniques which he applied to television adaptations of science fiction and fantasy stories, by authors such as Stanislaw Lem, Isaac Asimov, Alexei Tolstoy, Jonathan Swift, Dante Alighieri and others.
 
His director credits (according to IMDb, except where otherwise indicated), are 
 1994 Szent Gellért legendája (TV Movie) (also screenplay)
 1991 A próbababák bálja (TV Movie) 
 1989 Szindbád nyolcadik utazása (TV Mini-Series) 
 1985 Gyémántpiramis (TV Movie) 
 1982 Régi idők sci-fije - Sci-fi of old times (TV Movie)
 1980 Aelita (TV Movie) Based on Aelita by Alexei Tolstoy
 1980 Szetna, a varázsló (TV Movie) 
 1980 Ollantay, az Andok vezére (TV Movie) 
 1980 A fejenincs Írástudó (TV Movie) 
 1980 Gulliver az óriások országában (TV Movie) Based on Gulliver's Travels by Jonathan Swift
 1979 Szávitri, az asszonyi hüség dicsérete (TV Movie) 
 1978 Mesék az ezeregyéjszakáról (TV Movie) 
 1978 A táltosfiú és a világfa (TV Movie) 
 1978 Kalaf és Turandot története (TV Movie) 
 1976 A halhatatlanság halála (TV Movie) (also screenplay) Based on The End of Eternity by Isaac Asimov
 1975 Gilgames (TV Movie) (also screenplay)
 1974 Gulliver a törpék országában (TV Movie) (also screenplay) Based on Gulliver's Travels by Jonathan Swift
 1974 Pokol - Inferno (TV Movie) Based on La Commedia Divina (The Divine Comedy) by Dante Alighieri
 1973 Pirx kalandjai (TV Series) (also screenplay) Based on Tales of Pirx the Pilot by Stanislaw Lem

References

Male screenwriters
Hungarian male writers
Hungarian television directors
1934 births
2004 deaths
20th-century Hungarian screenwriters